St Michael's Church, Grove Park (also called St Michael's, Sutton Court and St Michael's, Chiswick) is an Anglican church in the Grove Park district of Chiswick, opened in 1909. Its red brick architecture by W. D. Caröe & Herbert Passmore has been praised by Nikolaus Pevsner.

Architecture

St Michael's Church on Elmwood Road in the Sutton Court area of Grove Park, Chiswick, was designed in the Arts and Crafts style by the architects W. D. Caröe & Herbert Passmore; it was founded in 1908 and completed in 1909. It is described by Nikolaus Pevsner in The Buildings of England as "one of Caröe's most interesting churches in outer London". The "picturesque" building is in red brick, its buttresses joined by tiled arches, and with dormers in the roof. The crossing-point of the roof is marked by a turret with shingles and tiles; on the north of the crossing is "a curiously domestic excrescence" for ventilation and the church's belfry. The windows have decorative curving stone tracery in "free flamboyant Gothic" style; they are recessed under tiled arches. Inside, the font, lectern, and pulpit were brought from St Michael on the Strand, while the 1911 choir stalls were designed by Caröe. The south chapel's roof has a decoration made by Antony Lloyd in 1932. The stained glass windows in the south chapel and the sanctuary were made by Horace Wilkinson between 1914 and 1925.

The historian Jennifer Freeman writes of the building that "the emphasis externally is on the craftwork, on careful stone dressings, on subtle variations in the tilework, on the timbering, brickwork and leadwork", while it fits into its environment sensitively, in a place "still leafy enough to evoke the setting of a simple country church. Yet the building is a highly complex composition of red brick and tile". The St Michael's church architect Patrick Crawford comments that the most remarkable feature of the church is its tiled arches.

History 

The building was funded by the sale of St Michael, Burleigh Street, on the Strand, in central London, raising the sum of £20,500. The old church was demolished and replaced by the Strand Palace Hotel. The vicar of St Martin-in-the-Fields, near the Strand, became the patron of the new church. The new church cost £8,000 to build, including its site; the vicarage cost a further £1,800. A tin-roofed wooden church hall was built at a cost of £360; it was replaced in 1998 by a brick-built parish centre.

The church was the last of the Anglican parishes of Chiswick to be created, serving the new population of the Grove Park area west of Sutton Court Road, which had consisted up until the 1900s mainly of orchards and market gardens. The parish area was taken from the western part of the parish of St Nicholas, Chiswick.

The church has been Grade II listed since 1985.

Notes

References

Sources

External links
 

Church of England church buildings in the London Borough of Hounslow
Diocese of London
Buildings and structures in Chiswick
Grade II listed churches in London
Grade II listed buildings in the London Borough of Hounslow
Buildings by W. D. Caröe